BOCM is an obsolete reference to the now defunct British Oil & Cake Mills. 

It is now just used in its abbreviated form.

i.e.: There is no such organisation as British Oil & Cake Mills Pauls

It may refer to:

 BOCM Pauls
 BOCM Silcock - also obsolete